R. John Wright Dolls is an art doll making workshop located in Bennington, Vermont. Established in 1976, R. John Wright Dolls (RJW) is a privately held company founded by R. John Wright.

The company designs, produces and markets original felt doll and plush animal lines along with many licensed products including Winnie-the-Pooh, Raggedy Ann, Beatrix Potter characters, Disney, Paddington Bear, and The Wizard of Oz. The dolls are designed by John and Susan Wright and produced in numbered limited editions at the R. John Wright workshop in Bennington, Vermont.

History 

R. John Wright was born and raised in Michigan, where he attended Wayne State University and worked towards a degree in Liberal Arts. Two years later, having relocated to New England, he met his wife Susan who had a degree in Fine Arts from the University of New Hampshire. In November 1976, while living in Brattleboro, Vermont, R. John Wright created his first felt doll in the image of a simple male folk character. Production commenced at the couple's ground-floor apartment. These early dolls were primarily sold at juried craft fairs along the east coast including the American Craft Council (ACC) exhibitions in Rhinebeck, New York. The technique and style of the R. John Wright dolls underwent significant changes throughout 1977–78. The early felt dolls of the Steiff Company were a strong inspiration. The Wrights were also inspired by the early molded cloth dolls of Kathe Kruse and the felt Lenci dolls.  In 1978, through trial and error, the Wrights were able to reinvent the art of molded felt dolls using their own techniques.

In 1978, R. John Wright joined the United Federation of Doll Clubs (UFDC) and was elected to the National Institute of American Doll Artists (NIADA), where he served as the standards chairman of the organization.

In 1981, the R. John Wright facility relocated from Brattleboro, Vermont to Cambridge, New York.

Beginning in 1987, every R. John Wright item features an 8 mm brass identification button inscribed with the initials 'RJW.'

In 2005 the R. John Wright facility relocated from Cambridge, New York to Bennington, Vermont. All work continues to be done on site under the Wrights' direct supervision.

Disney Editions 
In 1984 R. John Wright Inc. began a 13-year relationship with the Walt Disney Company with the development of a range of dolls and animals based closely on the original illustrations by E. H. Shepard in the Winnie-the-Pooh books by A. A. Milne. These products ushered in a new licensing division titled “Classic Winnie the Pooh” which was a departure in Disney's marketing of Winnie the Pooh products in the U.S. Several editions of Winnie-the-Pooh and other characters from the Hundred Acre Wood were produced.

Under license with Disney, the R. John Wright company went on to produce many Disney art character dolls including Mickey Mouse, Minnie Mouse, Cinderella, Pinocchio, Geppetto, and Snow White and the Seven Dwarfs. The Snow White and the Seven Dwarfs set won the RJW Company the Award of Excellence from DOLLS Magazine in 1998.

Licensed items 

2002, R. John Wright produced the Clifford Berryman Bear under license with Linda Mullins to commemorate the centennial anniversary of the Teddy Bear.

1984-1999, R. John Wright was under license with the Walt Disney Company for collectible dolls and plush. In 1985 the RJW Company received the first Doll of the Year Award from Doll Reader magazine for their rendition of Christopher Robin and Winnie-the-Pooh.
1999, RJW was licensed to produce Rose O'Neill's Kewpie in felt. Production coincided with an extensive R. John Wright tour and exhibition at the Takashimaya department store in Japan.
2000-2008, RJW secured licensing to produce the Beatrix Potter Collection with the introduction of Peter Rabbit and a series of animal characters from the Beatrix Potter books.
2000-2002, three editions of The Little Prince were produced under license with the Estate of Antoine de Saint-St. Exupéry, including a one of a kind figure that traveled the world from January 2001 to January 2002 and sold by the doll auction house Theriault's for $35,000 with proceeds going to St. Jude's Children's Research.
2000-2002, R. John Wright produced several editions of Paddington Bear under license with the Copyrights Group
2004-2008, RJW was licensed with the Copyrights Group to produce Raggedy Ann and other related characters created by Johnny Gruelle.
2006, The French comic character Becassine was produced by special permission from the copyright holder and publisher, Gautier-Languereau/Hachette Jeunesse.
2007-2008, RJW and the Steiff Company in Germany collaborated on a series of felt child dolls titled 'Steiff Kinder.'
2007, The 50th Anniversary of Edith The Lonely Doll by Dare Wright was met with limited edition replica based on the original Lenci doll.
2009-2015, RJW produced felt dolls based on the Flower Fairy books of Cicely Mary Barker under license with Frederick Warne & Co.
2010-2018, RJW was licensed by Warner Bros. to produce felt art dolls and mohair mice based on the film the Wizard of Oz.
2012, an edition of the vintage Patsy and Skippy dolls designed by Bernard Lipfert were made by special permission of the copyright holders.
2013, RJW began production of felt dolls based on the original Hummel designs under license from M.I. Hummel. In 1992, Goebel distributed a series of Christmas Angels including the Celestial Musician which has been released by RJW in late 2015.

In 2016, the company will mark its 40th anniversary with joint ventures with Steiff, an extensive array of licensed pieces, and a line of mice, bears, cats, dogs, and lambs.

Collector's Club 
In 1996, the company formed the R. John Wright Collector's Club which attracted more than 4,000 members worldwide.

Awards 
1985, Doll of the Year Award from Doll Reader magazine, Christopher Robin & Winnie-the-Pooh
1986, Doll of the Year Award from Doll Reader magazine, Little Brother, Little Sister
1988, DOLLS Magazine Award of Excellence, Snow White and the Seven Dwarfs
1994, Jumeau Trophy, Most Outstanding Male Artist of Child Dolls in the World
1994, Golden Teddy Award from Teddy Bear Review magazine, Pocket Pooh
1995, DOLLS Magazine Award of Excellence, Geppetto & Pinocchio
2000, Der Goldene George Award, presented at Teddybar Total for Paddington Bear.
2005, Jones Publishing Lifetime Achievement Award

Quotes 
"R. John Wright and his fanciful felt dolls exemplify the fine work being done by doll artists today."

"I am grateful that somehow I was given the strength—and the unfounded optimism—to begin making dolls. I don’t know where that came from, but it was like being on the edge of a cliff with no other alternative but to jump. I’m glad I did. But even if I had failed, it would be preferable to never knowing."

References

External links 
 
 United Federation of Doll Collectors
 National Institute of American Doll Artists

Doll manufacturing companies
Dollmakers
Toy companies established in 1976
Doll brands
Toy companies of the United States
Manufacturing companies based in Vermont
1976 establishments in Vermont
American companies established in 1976